Northampton County is a county located in the U.S. state of North Carolina. As of the 2020 census, the population was 17,471. Its county seat is Jackson.

Northampton County is part of the Roanoke Rapids, NC Micropolitan Statistical Area, which is also included in the Rocky Mount-Wilson-Roanoke Rapids, NC Combined Statistical Area.

History
The county was formed in 1741 from Bertie County.  It was named for James Compton, 5th Earl of Northampton. In 1759 parts of Northampton County, Bertie County, and Chowan County were combined to form Hertford County.

In 1959, the county went to the U.S. Supreme Court to defend the use of a literacy test as a requirement to vote. In Lassiter v. Northampton County Board of Elections, the court held that, provided the tests were applied equally to all races and were not "merely a device to make racial discrimination easy," they were allowable.  Congress subsequently prohibited use of such tests under the National Voting Rights Act of 1965.

Geography

State and local protected areas 
 Lake Gaston Public Recreation Area (part)
 Roanoke Rapids Lake Day Use Area (part)
 Tillery Game Land (part)

Major water bodies 
 Bull Neck Swamp
 Corduroy Swamp
 Doolittle Millpond
 Gumberry Swamp
 Lake Gaston
 Meherrin River
 Occoneechee Creek
 Paddys Delight Creek
 Potecasi Creek
 Ramsey Creek
 Roanoke Rapids Lake
 Roanoke River
 Taylors Millpond
 Urahaw Swamp

Adjacent counties
 Greensville County, Virginia - north
 Southampton County, Virginia - northeast
 Hertford County - east
 Bertie County - southeast
 Halifax County - southwest
 Warren County - northwest
 Brunswick County, Virginia - north-northwest

Major highways

 
 
  (Bypass of Garysburg)

Demographics

2020 census

As of the 2020 United States census, there were 17,471 people, 8,547 households, and 5,610 families residing in the county.

2010 census
As of the 2010 United States Census, there were 22,099 people living in the county; 58.4% were Black or African American, 39.2% White, 0.5% Native American, 0.2% Asian, 0.8% of some other race and 1.0% of two or more races. 1.4% were Hispanic or Latino (of any race).

2000 census
As of the census of 2000, there were 22,086 people, 8,691 households, and 5,953 families living in the county. The population density was 41 people per square mile (16/km2). There were 10,455 housing units at an average density of 20 per square mile (8/km2). The racial makeup of the county was 59.43% Black or African American, 39.09% White, 0.32% Native American, 0.09% Asian, 0.05% Pacific Islander, 0.39% from other races, and 0.63% from two or more races. 0.73% of the population were Hispanic or Latino of any race.

There were 8,691 households, out of which 27.70% had children under the age of 18 living with them, 45.50% were married couples living together, 18.30% had a female householder with no husband present, and 31.50% were non-families. 28.40% of all households were made up of individuals, and 13.20% had someone living alone who was 65 years of age or older. The average household size was 2.44 and the average family size was 2.99.

In the county, the population was spread out, with 24.30% under the age of 18, 6.90% from 18 to 24, 26.50% from 25 to 44, 24.90% from 45 to 64, and 17.40% who were 65 years of age or older. The median age was 40 years. For every 100 females there were 92.00 males. For every 100 females age 18 and over, there were 88.60 males.

The median income for a household in the county was $26,652, and the median income for a family was $34,648. Males had a median income of $27,970 versus $21,183 for females. The per capita income for the county was $15,413. About 17.00% of families and 21.30% of the population were below the poverty line, including 29.80% of those under age 18 and 21.50% of those age 65 or over.

Government and politics
Northampton County is a member of the regional Upper Coastal Plain Council of Governments. Northampton is a traditionally Democratic county, being one of only two counties in the state won by George McGovern during his 1972 landslide loss. Apart from several contiguous counties in South Texas; Northampton County is the only county in the United States to vote Democratic in every presidential election over the past century; the last Democratic candidate to lose the county was William Jennings Bryan in 1896. Apart from Hubert Humphrey and McGovern who received no more than 51 percent, every Democratic nominee in the past century has received at least 60 percent of the county's vote.

Northampton County is part of North Carolina's 1st congressional district, which has a Cook Partisan Voting Index of D+3 and has been represented by a Democratic Congressman since 1899. It is currently represented by Donald G. Davis. In the North Carolina House of Representatives, Northampton County lies within the 27th District, which also covers Halifax County and is represented by Democrat Michael H. Wray. In the North Carolina Senate, Northampton County lies within the 3rd Senate district, represented by Democrat Erica Smith-Ingram.

Education 
The North Carolina Department of Public Instruction rated the county school system as "low-performing" for the 2021–2022 school year.

Communities

Towns

 Conway
 Garysburg
 Gaston (largest town)
 Jackson (county seat)
 Lasker
 Rich Square
 Seaboard
 Severn
 Woodland

Unincorporated communities
 Margarettsville
 Milwaukee
 Pleasant Hill
 Turners Crossroads

Townships

 Gaston
 Jackson
 Kirby
 Occoneechee
 Pleasant Hill
 Rich Square
 Roanoke
 Seaboard
 Wiccanee

See also
 List of counties in North Carolina
 National Register of Historic Places listings in Northampton County, North Carolina
 Meherrin Indian Tribe, state-recognized tribe that resides in the county

Notes
South Texas counties voting Democrat at every election since before World War I comprise (going clockwise from the north) Webb, Duval, Jim Hogg, Brooks and Starr Counties

References

External links

 
 
 Northampton County Chamber of Commerce
 Northampton County Health Department
  Northampton County Public Schools
 NCGenWeb Northampton County - free genealogy resources for the county

 
Roanoke Rapids, North Carolina micropolitan area
1741 establishments in North Carolina
Populated places established in 1741
Black Belt (U.S. region)
Majority-minority counties in North Carolina